John A. Hart., Jr., known as Jack Hart (born April 21, 1961), is an American lawyer and former state legislator who served as a Democratic member of the Massachusetts Senate from 2002 to 2013. He was educated at Boston College High School, Worcester Academy, Tufts University (B.A.), and Harvard Kennedy School at Harvard University (M.P.A.). Hart also graduated from New England Law - Boston (J.D.).

Hart was elected to the Massachusetts Senate in 2002 by a special election to fill the First Suffolk Senate Seat. Prior to his election to the State Senate, he served as a State Representative in the Massachusetts House of Representatives from 1996 to 2002. He resigned from the legislature in 2013 to join a private law firm.

External links
 Campaign website
 Massachusetts General Court - State Senator Jack Hart
 

1961 births
Living people
Democratic Party Massachusetts state senators
Tufts University alumni
Harvard Kennedy School alumni
Democratic Party members of the Massachusetts House of Representatives
Worcester Academy alumni
Boston College High School alumni